Come As You Are is the second solo album by Peter Wolf, released in 1987 (see 1987 in music). "Come As You Are" was a major hit for Wolf, peaking at #15 on the Billboard Hot 100 and #1 on the Mainstream Rock Tracks chart for one week.

The music video for "Come As You Are" is based on Bobby Van's memorable "street dance" from Small Town Girl.  In the video, Peter Wolf hops around a 1950s small town similar to the one in the movie, and he passes a poster for Small Town Girl as a direct reference to the inspiration for the video.

Track listing
"Can't Get Started" (Peter Wolf) - 3:01
"Love on Ice" (Wolf, Tim Mayer) - 4:12
"Thick as Thieves" (Wolf, Tim Mayer) - 2:59
"Blue Avenue" (Wolf, Tim Mayer, Barry Goldberg) - 4:06
"Wind Me Up" (Wolf) - 2:49
"Come as You Are" (Wolf, Tim Mayer) - 2:43
"Flame of Love" (Wolf) - 4:16
"Mamma Said" (Wolf, Michael Jonzun) - 4:04
"Magic Moon" (Wolf) - 3:39
"2 Lane" (Wolf) - 3:23
"Run Silent Run Deep" (Wolf, Tim Mayer) - 4:39

Personnel
Peter Wolf - vocals, backing vocals
Bobby Chouinard - drums
Jeff Golub - guitar
Jim Gregory - bass
Lani Groves - backing vocals
Arno Hecht - horn
Victor LeComer - keyboards
Tom Mandel - keyboards
Skip McDonald - guitar
Steve Scales - percussion
Frank Simms - backing vocals
George Simms - backing vocals
John Songdahl - keyboards
Bird Taylor - backing vocals
Buck Taylor - backing vocals
John Turi - horn
Doug Wimbish - bass

Production
Produced by Peter Wolf and Eric "ET" Thorngren.
Recorded and mixed by Eric "ET" Thorngren, with mixing assistance by Marc Cobrin.
Mastered by Jack Skinner
Studio assistant: Gary Wright
Art direction: Henry Marquez, Janet Perr
Album design: Janet Perr
Photography: Annie Leibovitz

Charts
Album - Billboard (United States)

Singles - Billboard (United States)

Commercial uses 
After its July 1990 acquisition by the Universal Church of the Kingdom of God, the Brazilian television channel Rede Record used the song "Come as You Are" in a clip. The same song was used in a documentary about 40 years of Brazilian TV, September 18, 1990, from TV Cultura of São Paulo.

References

Peter Wolf albums
1987 albums
EMI America Records albums